Henry Onyemanze Nwosu  (born 14 June 1963) is a former Nigerian footballer turned manager.

Career
Nwosu spent his career at home with New Nigeria Bank (NNB) of Benin City and African Continental Bank (ACB) of Lagos. He also played for ASEC Mimosas FC of Ivory Coast and Racing FC Bafoussam of Cameroon.

International career
A gifted midfielder, Nwosu was the youngest member of Nigeria's victorious 1980 African Nations Cup squad, and scored the only goal for Nigeria at the 1980 Olympics. He also played in the 1982, 1984 and 1988 tournaments, finishing runners up in the latter two, with his last game for Nigeria coming in 1991.

Coaching career
He was an assistant for former Eagles teammate Samson Siasia at the 2008 Beijing Olympics where Nigeria won the silver medal. He was an assistant to Onigbinde that took the Super Eagles to 2002 FIFA World Cup in Korea and Japan. 
On 27 September 2008, Nwosu was appointed as the coach for the Nigerian U-17 team. However, he was removed from the post in April 2009 after a string of poor results in preparation for the 2009 FIFA U-17 World Cup. Nwosu was hired that August as coach of Union Bank F.C. 
In October 2013, he was named coach for Abeokuta club Gateway United F.C.

References

External links

Why I took Union Bank job

1963 births
Living people
Africa Cup of Nations-winning players
Nigerian footballers
Nigeria international footballers
Olympic footballers of Nigeria
Footballers at the 1980 Summer Olympics
Footballers at the 1988 Summer Olympics
1980 African Cup of Nations players
1982 African Cup of Nations players
1984 African Cup of Nations players
1988 African Cup of Nations players
Racing Club Bafoussam players
ASEC Mimosas players
Nigerian expatriate footballers
Nigerian expatriate sportspeople in Cameroon
Nigerian expatriate sportspeople in Ivory Coast
Expatriate footballers in Cameroon
Expatriate footballers in Ivory Coast
ACB Lagos F.C. players
Association football midfielders
New Nigerian Bank F.C. players
Sportspeople from Imo State